Resinicium is a genus of crust fungi of uncertain placement in the class Agaricomycetes. The genus was circumscribed by Estonian mycologist Erast Parmasto in 1968.

Species
Resinicium aculeatum Tellería, Melo & Dueñas (2008)
Resinicium bicolor (Alb. & Schwein.) Parmasto (1968)
Resinicium chiricahuaense Gilb. & Budington (1970)
Resinicium confertum Nakasone (2007)
Resinicium friabile Hjortstam & Melo (1997)
Resinicium furfuraceum (Bres.) Parmasto (1968)
Resinicium granulare (Burt) Sheng H.Wu (1990)
Resinicium luteosulphureum (Rick) Baltazar & Rajchenb. (2016)
Resinicium luteum Jülich (1978)
Resinicium monticola Nakasone (2007)
Resinicium mutabile Nakasone (2007)
Resinicium pinicola (J.Erikss.) J.Erikss. & Hjortstam (1981)
Resinicium praeteritum (H.S.Jacks. & Dearden) Ginns & M.N.L.Lefebvre (1993)
Resinicium rimulosum Nakasone (2007)
Resinicium saccharicola (Burt) Nakasone (2000)
Resinicium tenue Nakasone (2007)

References

Taxa described in 1968
Agaricomycetes
Agaricomycetes genera